Just Imagine... is a comic book line published by DC Comics. It was written by Stan Lee, co-creator of several popular Marvel Comics characters, in which he re-imagined DC superheroes, including Superman, Batman, Wonder Woman, Aquaman, Green Lantern, and the Flash.

Batman
In Just Imagine Stan Lee with Joe Kubert - Creating Batman (October 2001), Batman is known as Wayne Williams instead of Bruce Wayne. Creators Stan Lee and Joe Kubert based this version on the character created by Bob Kane and Bill Finger.

Unlike Bruce Wayne, Wayne Williams is African-American instead of Caucasian. He is in excellent physical condition and has a vast personal fortune, allowing him access to custom equipment, including night vision lenses, a Kevlar costume, sensors to magnify sound and a wingsuit/hang glider hybrid cape to glide.
 
Wayne Williams' father was a policeman who was killed in an ambush. Wayne is framed for a crime, so he vows revenge on "Handz", the gang leader who set him up. In prison, Williams befriends a scientist named Frederick Grant, who teaches him how to "develop his mind", as well as sewing and bodybuilding.

While incarcerated, Williams learns that his mother has also died, and he blames Handz for her death. After rescuing the warden during a prison riot, he was given a full pardon. On the outside, Williams is on the run from Handz, so, to keep a low profile, he shaves his head. Williams needs money, so he becomes a wrestler under the name of Batman, never unmasking in public. In a few short weeks, Batman has become a superstar in wrestling and attained extreme wealth. He searches for Grant and entrusts him with his secret identity. Wayne Williams has the money, skill and strength to fight Handz, but Frederick Grant has the technical know-how, so the two become partners. To keep a low profile, Wayne gives Frederick a mansion and acts as his bodyguard. Batman eventually finds and fights with Handz, who accidentally falls to his death in the conflict. No longer seeking vengeance, Batman begins a mission of justice to fight crime and protect the innocent from villains like Handz.

Wonder Woman
Wonder Woman, real name Maria Mendoza, debuted in Just Imagine Stan Lee with Jim Lee Creating Wonder Woman (October 2001). Creators Stan Lee and Jim Lee based this version on the original DC character created by William Moulton Marston.

Maria is an activist, protesting against the corporate excavation of an ancient Incan holy site near her village. The CEO Armando Guitez has a plan: gain power from the site and take over the world. When Maria's father is kidnapped by the CEO and taken to the excavation, Maria follows, only to arrive too late to prevent her father's death. Guitez gains demonic powers from artifacts at the site, and then travels to Los Angeles. Maria finds the staff of Manco Capac, granting her the powers of the Incan Sun god, and uses them to pursue and defeat him. She then decides to remain in Los Angeles, taking the name Wonder Woman.

Superman
Superman, real name Salden, debuted in Just Imagine Stan Lee with John Buscema Creating Superman (November 2001). Creators Stan Lee and John Buscema based this version on the character created by Jerry Siegel and Joe Shuster.

His powers include great strength and immaculate speed. Salden was the weakest member of the Kryptonian Police Force. He used a flying harness and managed to capture a dangerous criminal in a teleportation lab. However, the criminal sent Salden and himself on a one-way trip to an insignificant little blue-green planet: Earth. The two men arrive separately, both discovering that they have enhanced physical abilities. The criminal sets himself up as the king of a jungle tribe.

Earth is too primitive, but it has the potential to develop the technology that Salden needs to return to his home world. The problem is that there are too many obstacles to the peaceful future necessary for technological advancement: war, crime, poverty, etc. Salden decides to become a superhero in order to rid the world of these impediments and calls himself Superman.

Green Lantern
Green Lantern, real name Len Lewis, debuted in Just Imagine Stan Lee and Dave Gibbons Creating Green Lantern (December 2001). Creators Stan Lee and Dave Gibbons based this version on the original character created by Martin Nodell and Bill Finger.

A professor is looking for something called "the Tree", mentioned in Norse legends as Yggdrasil and in Christianity as the Tree of Knowledge of Good and Evil. He finally traces the plant to an area in Africa. But when he finds the Tree, agents working for the Reverend Dominic Darrk, the leader of the Church of Eternal Empowerment, who are also searching for the Tree, shoot him and leave him for dead. Then the Tree shows the professor its history, which includes a race of pre-humans. It then grants him its power in order to "serve as a lantern in these dark times".

The Flash
The Flash, real name Mary Maxwell, debuted in Just Imagine Stan Lee and Kevin Maguire Creating Flash (January 2002). Creators Stan Lee and Kevin Maguire based this version on the original character created by Gardner Fox and Harry Lampert.

A typical college girl whose father is a scientist, Mary's life was very dull, and she longs to be a superhero like in the comic books she reads. She also has a life-threatening disease that slowly drains her energy. One day, enemies from her father's past, who are part of an organization named STEALTH (Special Team of Espionage Agents Licensed to Target and Hit), find and kill him. Before he dies, though, he injects Mary with the DNA of a hummingbird to save her from her wasting disease. This grants her the ability to travel at super-speed and she calls herself the Flash.

JLA
Lee's version of the Justice League of America debuted in Just Imagine Stan Lee and Jerry Ordway Creating JLA (February 2002). The members are Superman, Batman, Wonder Woman, Green Lantern and the Flash.

A man called the Reverend Dominic Darrk. is trying to summon a being called Crisis to Earth so that he can take over the planet. To this end, he creates some henchmen in the form of the Doom Patrol, whose members are the Blockbuster, Parasite, and Deathstroke. But Darrk's son, a young boy named Adam Strange, notifies five heroes of Darrk's intentions and they come together. Darrk, beaten, kills his son and then flees, bluffed into doing so by Green Lantern, who is (unbeknownst to Darrk) too weak to fight because his strength has been drained by the Parasite. Strange has powers too, and promises the heroes that he will return in some form. He then dies and the heroes officially incorporate as the Justice League.

Secret Files and Origins
Debuted in Just Imagine Stan Lee...Secret Files and Origins (March 2002).

In "The Coming Crisis", the National Exposer interviews the members of the Justice League. They explain their origins and warn Earth of Darrk's threat. Wonder Woman gets a hint of the League's future.

The issue also contains profiles of each hero, the Reverend Dominic Darrk and the Church of Eternal Empowerment.

Robin
Stan Lee's version of Robin, co-created with John Byrne, is an embittered teenager who works for the major villain of Lee's Just Imagine... universe, the Reverend Dominic Darrk (who appears in all 13 of the Just Imagine... issues). Darrk sends Robin out on various assignments, all the while promising him something in return. The book opens with Robin attempting his current assignment: to kill Lee's version of Batman.

Shazam!
Lee re-imagines the original Captain Marvel/Shazam! premise by having the hero be a mild-mannered Interpol agent, Robert Rogers. Teamed with the beautiful, and much tougher, fellow agent Carla Noral, the two of them are in India searching for the megalomaniacal master criminal Gunga Kahn. This version is co-created with Gary Frank and is based on the Bill Parker–C. C. Beck character.

In a back-up story plotted by Michael Uslan, scripted by Lee and Uslan and drawn by Kano, an orphaned American boy in India, at the same time as the adventures of Shazam, heroically saves a village from starvation with the help of a local boy named Zubin Navotny. The boy's name is Billy Marvel and he and Zubin are made honorary captains in the U.S. Peace Corps by an ambassador named Batson, thus making the boy "Captain Marvel".

Aquaman
Marine biologist Ramon Raymond is experimenting with dolphin DNA to see if humans can live underwater and decides to use himself as a test subject. But when he swims through a glowing patch of seawater, he finds he can now transform into a being of living water. This version is co-created with Scott McDaniel and is based on the Mort Weisinger-Paul Norris character.

Catwoman
Supermodel Joanie Jordan and her cat Ebony are struck by strange green lightning, creating a link between them and giving Jordan catlike abilities, including super-agility, heightened senses and razor-sharp claws. This version is co-created with Chris Bachalo and is based on the Bob Kane/Bill Finger character.

Sandman
On a crewed mission to investigate Saturn's largest moon Titan, astronaut Col. Larry Wilton is out on a spacewalk when his tether is cut by his traitorous colleague, Maj. Bryan Bleier. Left for dead, Wilton instead drifts into a mysterious green cloud and finds himself in a bizarre realm that he had always dreamed of as a child. It is here that a beautiful girl named Melana grants him the powers of the Sandman. This version is co-created with Walt Simonson and is based on the Gardner Fox-Allen Bert Christman character.

Crisis
Debuted in Just Imagine Stan Lee with John Cassaday Creating Crisis (September 2002).

When one of the Inca hawk runes is stolen, Wonder Woman summons all of Earth's new heroes. The Sandman arrives with Darrk's body and warns them of the coming of Darrk's master: a being called Crisis. Crisis arrives on Earth and only the Justice League can stop him...or they could, if there was not a traitor in their midst.

In this issue, which is the end of the story, there are other versions of some of DC's other characters: the Oracle, the Phantom Stranger, Hawkman and the Atom.

Collected editions
Just Imagine Stan Lee Creating the DC Universe Book 1 (2004-01-01/2020-03-11): includes Just Imagine Stan Lee with Dave Gibbons Creating Green Lantern #1, Just Imagine Stan Lee with Jerry Ordway Creating JLA #1, Just Imagine Stan Lee with Jim Lee Creating Wonder Woman #1, Just Imagine Stan Lee with Joe Kubert Creating Batman #1, Just Imagine Stan Lee with John Buscema Creating Superman #1, and Just Imagine Stan Lee with Kevin Maguire Creating The Flash #1.
Just Imagine Stan Lee Creating the DC Universe Book 2 (2004-06-09/2020-12-30): includes Just Imagine Stan Lee with John Byrne Creating Robin #1, Just Imagine Stan Lee with Gary Frank Creating Shazam! #1, Just Imagine Stan Lee with Scott McDaniel Creating Aquaman #1, Just Imagine Stan Lee with Chris Bachalo Creating Catwoman #1, Just Imagine Stan Lee with Walter Simonson Creating the Sandman #1, and Just Imagine Stan Lee with John Cassaday Creating Crisis #1.
Just Imagine Stan Lee Creating the DC Universe Book 3 (2004-06-09): Includes Aquaman, Sandman (with Walter Simonson), Catwoman (with Chris Bachalo), Crisis (with John Cassaday).
Just Imagine Stan Lee Creating the DC Universe Omnibus (2013-12-11): Includes Book 1, Book 2 and Book 3.

References

External links
Just Imagine Stan Lee
popmatters.com Just Imagine Stan Lee
Comic Book DB page

DC Comics limited series
Comics by Stan Lee
2001 comics debuts